The 2008–09 Czech 2. Liga was the 16th season of the 2. česká fotbalová liga, the second tier of the Czech football league. Bohemians 1905 were promoted to the Czech First League as winners of the league. Second placed Čáslav decided not to promote and sold their license to Slovácko, who were promoted in their place.

Team changes

From 2. Liga
Promoted to Czech First League
 FK Bohemians Praha (Střížkov)
 FK Marila Příbram

Relegated to Moravian-Silesian Football League
 FC Hlučín

Relegated to Bohemian Football League
 SK Sparta Krč

To 2. Liga
Relegated from Czech First League
 Bohemians 1905
 FK SIAD Most

Promoted from Bohemian Football League
 Sparta Prague B

Promoted from Moravian-Silesian Football League
 MFK Karviná

League table

Top goalscorers

See also
 2008–09 Czech First League
 2008–09 Czech Cup

References

Official website 

Czech 2. Liga seasons
Czech
2008–09 in Czech football